Severino is an Italian, Spanish, and Portuguese given name and sometimes surname:

 Saint Severinus of Noricum (c.410–482), a Roman Catholic saint:
 Severin of Cologne, a Roman Catholic saint
 Emanuele Severino (1929–2020), Italian philosopher
 Isabelle Severino (born 1980), French gymnast
 Lucas Severino (born 1979), Brazilian footballer
 Luis Severino (born 1994), Dominican baseball player
 Paola Severino (born 1948), Italian Justice Minister and University Rector
 Pedro Severino (born 1993), Dominican baseball player
 Robson Severino da Silva (born 1983), Brazilian footballer
 Roger Severino, United States lawyer
 Sérgio Severino da Silva (born 1978), Brazilian footballer

Given name
Severino Albarracín (1851–1878), Spanish anarchist
Severino Antinori (born 1945), Italian gynecologist and embryologist
Severino Cavalcanti (1930–2020), Brazilian politician
Severino Compagnoni (1914–2006), Italian cross country skier
Severino Di Giovanni (1901–1931), Italian anarchist
Severino Gazzelloni (1919–1992), Italian flutist
Severino Montano (1915–1980), Filipino playwright, director and actor
Severino Poletto (born 1933), Italian cardinal
Severino dos Ramos Durval da Silva (born 1980), Brazilian footballer
Severino Reija (born 1938), Spanish footballer
Severino Reyes (1861–1942), Filipino writer, playwright and director
Severino Santiapichi (1926–2016), Italian magistrate and writer

See also
San Severino - Various places in Italy
 Severino (album), album by Brazilian band Os Paralamas do Sucesso released in 1994

Italian masculine given names
Spanish masculine given names